Kaare Christensen (born June 20, 1959) is a Danish epidemiologist and biostatistician. He is a professor of epidemiology at the University of Southern Denmark, where he also directs the Danish Aging Research Center and the Danish Twin Registry. He is known for his research on human longevity and aging. Specific topics he has researched include the increasing average life expectancy in developing countries, as well as the influence of genetic factors on human lifespan and international variations in levels of happiness. In 2016, he was awarded the Longevity Prize from the Fondation IPSEN "for his pioneering work on the importance of genes and environment in aging and longevity."

References

External links
Faculty page

Living people
1959 births
Danish statisticians
Danish epidemiologists
Academic staff of the University of Southern Denmark
University of Southern Denmark alumni
Biostatisticians
Genetic epidemiologists
Gerontologists